Love is Louder is the second studio album and by English musician James Cottriall, released on 24 February 2012 by Pate Records. The album includes the singles "By Your Side", "Smile" and "Stand Up". It peaked at number 10 on the Austrian Albums Chart.

Singles
"By Your Side" was released as the album's lead single on 20 May 2011. It peaked at number 24 on the Austrian Singles Chart. "Smile" was released as the album's second single on 11 November 2011. It peaked at number 12 on the Austrian Singles Chart. "Stand Up" was released as the album's second single on 20 January 2012. It peaked at number 10 on the Austrian Singles Chart.

Track listing

Chart performance

Release history

References

2012 albums
James Cottriall albums